Demetrio Carceller Segura (22 December 1894 – 16 November 1971) was a Spanish politician who served as Minister of Industry and Trade of Spain between 1940 and 1945, during the Francoist dictatorship.

References

1894 births
1971 deaths
Industry ministers of Spain
Government ministers during the Francoist dictatorship